Enner Glynn is a suburb of Nelson, New Zealand. It lies to the south of Nelson city centre and east of Stoke, inland from Wakatu.

Geography

Enner Glynn covers an area of 7.06 km².

The suburb has two local parks: Jenkins Creek Esplanade and Enner Glynn North Reserve.

History

The estimated population of Enner Glynn reached 2,360 in 1996.

It reached 2,430 in 2001, 2,790 in 2006, 2,700 in 2013, and 2,810 in 2018.

Demography

It has a population density of 426.56 people per km² as of 2019.

As of the 2018 census, the median age was 51.2, the median income was $34,600, 5.7% of people earned over $100,00, 22.5% had a Bachelor's Degree or higher, and 3.0% of the workforce was unemployed.

Ethnically, the population was 91.4% New Zealand European, 10.3% Māori, 1.7% Pacific peoples, and 3.9% Asian; 18.4% were born overseas.

Religiously, the population is 57.7% non-religious and 31.7% Christian, and there is a small Buddhist community.

Economy

In 2018, 11.4% worked in manufacturing, 9.7% worked in construction, 4.9% worked in hospitality, 5.2% worked in transport, 0.0% worked in finance and administration, 7.6% worked in education, and 13.7% worked in healthcare.

Transport

As of 2018, among those who commute to work, 75.1% drove a car, 6.8% rode in a car, 3.7% use a bike, and 3.7% walk or run.

No one uses public transport.

Education

Enner Glynn School is a co-educational state primary school for Year 1 to 6 students.

References

Suburbs of Nelson, New Zealand
Populated places in the Nelson Region